Adrián Zendejas Rodríguez (born August 30, 1995) is an American professional soccer player who plays as a goalkeeper for USL Championship club Miami FC, on loan from  Charlotte FC of Major League Soccer.

Career

Youth
Zendejas grew up playing with Nomads SC and San Diego Surf of the U.S. Soccer Development Academy, and for Hilltop High School, before joining the under-20s of Liga MX side Tijuana.

Professional
On June 30, 2016, Zendejas signed with United Soccer League side Swope Park Rangers. He went 8-0-0 in his first eight starts. In helping Rangers to the USL Cup Final, he had a 0.36 goals against average and 0.87 save percentage, both ranking best in the USL among all goalkeepers with at least eight appearances.

In December 2016, Zendejas signed a Major League Soccer contract with Sporting Kansas City. He began the 2017 MLS season as backup to Tim Melia, before re-joining Rangers on loan from Sporting KC. In 25 USL appearances, he had 10 shutouts and a goals-against-average of 0.91, again regarded as one of USL's top goalkeepers. In the USL Cup Playoffs against OKC Energy, after making two saves in regulation, one save in extra time, and four saves in the penalty shootout, Zendejas himself scored the game-winning penalty kick that sent Swope Park to the USL Cup Final again.

In 2018, Zendejas split time between starting on loan at Swope Park in USL and backing up Tim Melia in MLS. On June 6, Zendejas made his Sporting KC debut in the fourth round of the U.S. Open Cup, shutting out Real Salt Lake over 90 minutes in a 2-0 victory. On June 18, he went 90 minutes again for Sporting KC in the Open Cup, in the Round of 16 against FC Dallas, notching five saves in a 3-2 victory.

On November 19, 2019, Zendejas was traded to Nashville SC in exchange for $125,000 of Targeted Allocation Money and $50,000 of General Allocation Money.

On September 18, 2020, Zendejas was traded again, this time to Minnesota United in exchange for a fourth round 2021 MLS SuperDraft pick and up to $100,000 in General Allocation Money if he meets certain performance-based metrics for Minnesota.

On May 21, 2021, Minnesota loaned Zendejas to El Paso Locomotive of the USL Championship.

On January 16, 2022, Zendejas joined Charlotte FC as a free agent ahead of their inaugural season in MLS.

On January 17, 2023, Zendejas was loaned to USL Championship side Miami FC.

International
Zendejas is eligible to play for the United States due to his birth and upbringing in Chula Vista, California, and for Mexico through parentage. He has expressed an interest in representing the United States.

Career statistics

Club

References

External links
 

1995 births
Living people
American soccer players
American sportspeople of Mexican descent
Club Tijuana footballers
Sporting Kansas City II players
Sporting Kansas City players
Nashville SC players
Minnesota United FC players
El Paso Locomotive FC players
Charlotte FC players
Charlotte Independence players
Miami FC players
Association football goalkeepers
Soccer players from California
Sportspeople from Chula Vista, California
USL Championship players
Major League Soccer players
USL League One players